The Roman Catholic Diocese of Chimoio is a diocese located in the city of Chimoio in the Ecclesiastical province of Beira in Mozambique.

History
 November 19, 1990: Established as Diocese of Chimoio from the Metropolitan Archdiocese of Beira

Bishops
 Bishops of Chimoio (Roman rite)
 Bishop Francisco João Silota, M. Afr. (19 November 1990 - 2 January 2017)
João Carlos Hatoa Nunes (2 January 2017 – Present)

Other priest of this diocese who became bishop
António Juliasse Ferreira Sandramo, appointed auxiliary bishop of Maputo in 2018

See also
Roman Catholicism in Mozambique

Sources
 GCatholic.org
 Catholic Hierarchy

Roman Catholic dioceses in Mozambique
Christian organizations established in 1990
Roman Catholic dioceses and prelatures established in the 20th century
1990 establishments in Mozambique
Roman Catholic Ecclesiastical Province of Beira